is an internet services company in Japan. It operates various services including the most popular social bookmarking service in Japan, Hatena Bookmark. Hatena is the collective name of the company's services. On July 19, 2001, it was founded by Junya Kondo in Kyoto. The company moved its headquarters to Shibuya, Tokyo on April 10, 2004. The headquarters were moved back to Kyoto in April, 2008.

Hatena Diary
Hatena Diary was Hatena's blog hosting service. On January 16, 2003, it was released as a beta version. On March 13, 2003, it was taken out of beta. Hatena Diary is a multi-lingual service which supports UTF-8 character encoding. Hatena Diary has a free version and a premium version. The chief characteristic of Hatena Diary is its keyword system. But was shortly replaced on July 26, 2019, by Hatena Blog

Hatena Notation
Hatena Notation, also known as Hatena Markup, is a markup language that can be used to produce content without the use of (X)HTML. There is also a Perl module available to parse Hatena markup.

ID Trackback
ID Trackback is a trackback not for a specific blog entry but for the specific user. If a user links to another Hatena Diary in their own Hatena Diary, a trackback is added automatically. ID Trackback is used to inform other users about what a user mentions on their Hatena Diary, and is designed to accelerate interaction between users of the service.

Hatena Fotolife
Hatena Fotolife is Hatena's in-house image hosting service started in 2004. Typically, when an image is posted on one of Hatena's other services, it would also be uploaded to a fotolife gallery under the name of the user who posted it. The website could also be uploaded to directly. Hatena Fotolife is only available in Japanese.

Hatena Keyword
Hatena Keywords is Hatena's dictionary service and automatically links to common Hatena services which mention the keyword. If a user meets the requirements and becomes a "Hatena Citizen", they may create and modify Hatena keywords.

Hatena Bookmark
Hatena Bookmark is a social bookmarking service. It is often colloquially referred to as Hatebu (はてブ). The user can save the specific URL as a bookmark and tag it. They are able to interact with the other users through the tags, and can leave comments of up to 100 double-byte characters in length.

Hatena Bookmark counts the number of users per specific URL, therefore it is possible to see what bookmarks are popular among Hatena users. "Add to Hatena Bookmark" button is integrated into a lot of famous news sites, asahi.com, CNET Japan, ZDNet Japan, Nikkei ITpro, and ITmedia.

Hatena Imacoco
Hatena Imacoco was a tool for sharing one's location on Hatena's services, with it commonly being used on the Japanese version of Hatena Haiku. It took the form of a little button one could press with footprints on it, as well as being a website of its own. Once used, it would post a small embedded map with the user's current geographical location marked on it, as well as their local surroundings.

Hatena in English
In mid-2007, Hatena was made available in the English language. The services available on the English hatena.com site are:

 Hatena Haiku (a micro-blog service similar to Twitter or Jaiku. English service ended in January 2015. Japanese service also ended in March 2019). There was also a site named "Hatena Haiku 2" with a layout likely designed for use with mobile devices. However, this site would never leave beta and was eventually discontinued at an unknown time.
 Hatena World (a 3D interactive world similar to Second Life. Ended on June 18, 2010). 
 Hatena Star (a blog post rating service, as well as a service for seeing the stars you've received on other services). 
 Hatena Message (a messaging service). 
 Flipnote Hatena (a flipbook hosting service, similar to YouTube and DeviantArt, for Flipnote Studio users. Ended on May 31, 2013). 
 Hatena Monolith (a service that lets users scan barcodes and post them to  their collections or Twitter. Ended on July 1, 2014). 
 Miiverse (with Nintendo Network Business & Development. Ended on November 7, 2017). 
 SplatNet 2 (a Splatoon 2 companion service for the Nintendo Switch Online app). 
 Functions for the Super Smash Bros. Ultimate videogame.
 SplatNet 3 (successor to SplatNet 2 for Splatoon 3).

References

External links

Japanese companies established in 2001
Online companies of Japan
Blog hosting services
Companies based in Kyoto
Internet properties established in 2001
Japanese brands
Internet technology companies of Japan